Drengsrud is a village in Asker municipality, Akershus county, Norway.

Villages in Akershus